The 34th World Rowing Championships were held at the Nagaragawa International Regatta Course in Kaizu, Gifu Prefecture, Japan, between August 29 and September 4, 2005.

The 2005 championships were the first championships to be held in Asia.

The regatta infrastructure at the Nagaragawa International Regatta Course was designed and built with the 2005 World Championships in mind.

Gallery

References

Rowing venues
Sport in Gifu Prefecture